Fungus the Bogeyman is a 1977 children's picture book by British artist Raymond Briggs. It follows one day in the life of the title character, a working class Bogeyman with the mundane job of scaring human beings. The character and all related properties are now owned by Vivendi's Studiocanal.

Plot
The book follows a typical day for Fungus the Bogeyman, starting when he wakes up and ending just before he falls asleep. As his day progresses, he undergoes a mild existential crisis, pondering what his seemingly pointless job of scaring surface people is really for. He is a member of the Bogey society, which is very similar to British society, but Bogeymen enjoy things which humans (called Drycleaners because of their contrasting environmental preferences) would not be comfortable around; for example darkness, damp, cold and over-ripe food. The book depicts the mundane details of Bogey life in loving detail, with definitions of Bogey slang and numerous annotations concerning the  myths, pets, hobbies, literature, clothing and food of the Bogeys.

Much of the humour derives from word play. For example, Bogeymen are shown to enjoy eating and sharing flies in a similar way to human cigarettes; one brand of fly is the "strong French Gallwasp", a pun on the cigarette Gauloises.

Adaptations
Over a period of decades, a number of attempts were made to make a film from the book, which was difficult given its lack of an actual plot. In 2002 the BBC began work on a three-part TV comedy series, which ultimately aired in November 2004 and is available as a DVD, starring Clare Thomas as Jessica White, Martin Clunes as her father and Mak Wilson as Fungus. This Gala Films production with screenplay by author Mark Haddon, featuring live-action humans and animated Bogeys, was nominated for five awards. It tells of how Jessica, a human teenager, finds her way into Bogeydom and meets Fungus and his family. The family has an addition, a daughter named Mucus, and Fungus' son Mould (who featured in the original book) is a teenager going through a rebellious phase: cleaning things instead of dirtying them.

A three-part adaptation, featuring Timothy Spall as the title character, aired on Sky1 in December 2015 and was partly shot at West London Film Studios. This adaption also starred Marc Warren, Keeley Hawes, Joanna Scanlan, Jimmy Akingbola, Paul Kaye, and also Victoria Wood in her final television role before her death in April 2016. It was produced by Andy Serkis's motion-capture studio, The Imaginarium, with Serkis also as the narrator.

A stage production, based on the book, was performed at artsdepot in North London between November 2007 and August 2008. A co-production with Pilot Theatre, the show was directed and adapted by Marcus Romer and designed by Ali Allen.

TV series 
Fungus the Bogeyman (Original) (28 November 2004 – 12 December 2004)
Fungus the Bogeyman (Revival) (27 – 29 December 2015)

References

External links
Toonhound: 
 
 

1977 children's books
Children's books adapted into television shows
British children's books
British picture books
Television shows based on children's books
Novels by Raymond Briggs
Picture books by Raymond Briggs